Travis Mayweather is a fictional character, portrayed by Anthony Montgomery, in the television series Star Trek: Enterprise, serving as a navigator and helm officer aboard the starship Enterprise. He holds the rank of ensign, and is in the command division. Mayweather is one of the main characters throughout the show's entire four-season run.

Character overview

Television series
Mayweather was born in 2126 aboard the ECS Horizon, a human J-class cargo ship, and has visited the fictional planets Trillius Prime, Draylax, Vega Colony, and both Tenebian moons. He is a "boomer", meaning he grew up aboard cargo ships, and that he has more experience in space than even his commanding officer, Captain Jonathan Archer.

Mayweather is a quiet and enthusiastic young man who is a highly skilled pilot and has some spelunking experience. He has at least one brother, Paul, who became the captain of the Horizon after the death of their father, the ship's previous captain, in January 2153. Their mother, Rianna, was the ship's medic and chief engineer. There is also mention that Mayweather has a sister who is married, but is never seen. While heading to Deneva Station, the Horizon was attacked by pirates but Mayweather's experience with weapons from Starfleet allowed the Horizon to defend herself.

Over the course of the series, Mayweather has been injured, incapacitated, or even "killed" more times than any other character in the primary cast.

When Star Trek: Enterprise was first conceived, Mayweather was intended to be a lieutenant but his rank was changed to Ensign because the producers felt that having Mayweather and the older Malcolm Reed at a similar rank wouldn't be believable.

Novels
In the novel Rise of the Federation: A Choice of Futures, Mayweather is promoted to first officer of USS Pioneer under Captain Malcolm Reed.

Costumes 
There were five uniforms made for this character over the show's run, and they were later auctioned off. Examples of this include the MACO uniform and a Red-shirt Mirror Universe costume for the episode "In A Mirror Darkly".

Mirror Universe
In the two-part episode "In a Mirror, Darkly", the Mirror Universe version of Travis Mayweather is a sergeant in the MACO corps. He eventually allies himself with the Mirror Hoshi Sato in her attempt to take over the Terran Empire.

Actor commentary and episodes
In an interview conducted towards the end of the first season, Anthony Montgomery suggested that it would be good to see Travis Mayweather's parents make an appearance on the show. Montgomery was pleased when this came true in "Horizon", saying, "It was really a touching episode for me, you got a feel of how hard it was for Travis to leave the family and join Starfleet."

Reception
According to author David Greven, "Ensign Travis Mayweather, the helmsman, is African American and a complete blank, rarely is given even one non-technobabble line an episode; without the slightest exaggeration, it is entirely accurate to say that Nichelle Nichols' Uhura on Original Trek had more lines of dialog." In 2016, Travis was ranked as the 33rd most important character of Starfleet within the Star Trek science fiction universe by Wired magazine, out of 100 characters.

Nerd Infinite thought Mayweather was an interesting character due to growing up in space, but would have liked more stories about him.

See also
 List of Star Trek: Enterprise characters

References

External links

 STARTREK.COM: Travis Mayweather 

Star Trek: Enterprise characters
Fictional African-American people
Starfleet ensigns
Fictional space pilots
Fictional helmsmen
Fictional navigators
Television characters introduced in 2001
Fictional people from the 22nd-century